Elections to the Massachusetts Senate were held on November 4, 1908 to elect 40 State Senators to the 130th Massachusetts General Court. Candidates were elected at the district level, with many districts covering multiple towns or counties.

Results summary

District results

Berkshire

Apportionment 
This district contained the following towns:

Results

Berkshire, Hampshire, and Hampden

Apportionment 
This district contained the following towns:

Results

First Bristol

Apportionment 
This district contained the following towns:

Results

Second Bristol

Apportionment 
This district contained the following towns:

Results

Third Bristol

Apportionment 
This district contained the following towns:

Results

Cape

Apportionment 
This district contained the following towns:

Results

First Essex

Apportionment 
This district contained the following towns:

Results

Second Essex

Apportionment 
This district contained the following towns:

Results

Third Essex

Apportionment 
This district contained the following towns:

Results

Fourth Essex

Apportionment 
This district contained the following towns:

Results

Fifth Essex

Apportionment 
This district contained the following towns:

Results

Franklin and Hampshire

Apportionment 
This district contained the following towns:

Results

First Hampden

Apportionment 
This district contained the city of Springfield.

Results

Second Hampden

Apportionment 
This district contained the following towns:

Results

First Middlesex

Apportionment 
This district contained the following towns:

Results

Second Middlesex

Apportionment 
This district contained Wards 5 through 11 of Cambridge.

Results

Third Middlesex

Apportionment 
This district contained the city of Somerville.

Results

Fourth Middlesex

Apportionment 
This district contained the cities of Everett, Malden, and Melrose.

Results

Fifth Middlesex

Apportionment 
This district contained the following towns:

Results

Sixth Middlesex

Apportionment 
This district contained the following towns:

Results

Seventh Middlesex

Apportionment 
This district contained the following towns:

Results

Eighth Middlesex

Apportionment 
This district contained the following towns:

Results

First Norfolk

Apportionment 
This district contained the following towns:

Results

Second Norfolk

Apportionment 
This district contained the following towns:

Results

First Plymouth

Apportionment 
This district contained the following towns:

Results

Second Plymouth

Apportionment 
This district contained the following towns:

Results

First Suffolk

Apportionment 
This district contained the following towns:

Results

Second Suffolk

Apportionment 
This district contained Wards 2–5 of Boston and Wards 1-3 of Cambridge.

Results

Third Suffolk

Apportionment 
This district contained Wards 6–8 of Boston and Ward 4 of Cambridge.

Results

Fourth Suffolk

Apportionment 
This district contained Wards 9, 12, and 17 of Boston.

Results

Fifth Suffolk

Apportionment 
This district contained Wards 10, 11, and 25 of Boston.

Results

Sixth Suffolk

Apportionment 
This district contained Wards 13 through 16 of Boston.

Results

Seventh Suffolk

Apportionment 
This district contained Wards 18, 19, and 22 of Boston.

Results

Eighth Suffolk

Apportionment 
This district contained Wards 20 and 21 of Boston.

Results

Ninth Suffolk

Apportionment 
This district contained Wards 23 and 24 of Boston.

Results

First Worcester

Apportionment 
This district contained Wards 4 through 10 of Worcester.

Results

Second Worcester

Apportionment 
This district contained the following towns:

Results

Third Worcester

Apportionment 
This district contained the following towns:

Results

Fourth Worcester

Apportionment 
This district contained the following towns:

Results

Worcester and Hampden

Apportionment 
This district contained the following towns:

Results

See also 
 1909 Massachusetts legislature
 List of former districts of the Massachusetts Senate

Bibliography

References 

Senate 1908
Massachusetts
1908 Massachusetts elections
Massachusetts Senate